Pierre Frédéric de la Croix (1709 – 1782), was an 18th-century painter from the Northern Netherlands.

Biography
He was born in France but moved to The Hague, where he joined the Confrerie Pictura in 1753. He was deaf mute, but had several children, including his daughter Susanna who married the flower painter Jan van Os, and the mysterious "J. de la Croix", both of whom were known for pastel portraits in the manner of their father.
He died in The Hague.

References

Pierre Frédéric de la Croix on Artnet

1709 births
1782 deaths
18th-century Dutch painters
18th-century Dutch male artists
Dutch male painters
Artists from The Hague
Painters from The Hague